Jenna Johnson (born April 12, 1994) is an American Latin and ballroom dancer and choreographer. She first gained attention in 2013, as she finished ladies' third runner-up on So You Think You Can Dance season 10. Johnson continued her professional dancing career on Dancing with the Stars, winning her second season with her partner, Olympic figure skater Adam Rippon.

Early life
Johnson was born in California, but raised in Provo, Utah. Her two older sisters, Stacy and Jill, also are dancers.  Johnson is a five-time U.S. National Latin Champion, U.S. National Youth 10 Dance Champion, as well as a three-time National Contemporary Winner. In 2012, she represented the United States at the World Latin Dance Champions.

So You Think You Can Dance
Johnson was a contestant on season 10 of So You Think You Can Dance. She first auditioned the show in Memphis, Tennessee. Her two older sisters had auditioned prior to her, but were cut at Green Mile. She was paired with contemporary dancer Tucker Knox and made it to the top 8. Her specialty was Latin Ballroom. She was eliminated on August 20, 2013. In 2016, she was one of the mentors and choreographers on So You Think You Can Dance: The Next Generation. She competed alongside Jake Monreal and made it to the Top 8 before elimination on August 1, 2016. She returned to season 14 as an all-star, mentoring Kiki Nyemchek, and made it to the Top 4.

Dancing With The Stars 
Johnson was a troupe member on Dancing with the Stars from season 18 to season 22. She became a professional dancer on season 23 and was partnered with actor Jake T. Austin. They danced jive and cha-cha and were the first couple eliminated on September 20, 2016. Due to Sharna Burgess sitting out the October 31 and November 7 shows for a knee injury from the October 24 dress rehearsal, Johnson filled in as James Hinchcliffe's partner in weeks 8 and 9 and was their trio partner in Week 10.

After taking season 24 off, she returned in season 25 as a troupe member. In April 2018, Johnson was announced to be a pro for her second time on season 26 and she was paired with Olympic figure skater Adam Rippon. The couple reached the finals and won the competition on May 21, 2018.  She is one of few dancers to win in her second season and to win after being eliminated first in her previous season.

Following her win, Johnson returned for season 27 and she was paired with reality television star Joe Amabile. Despite continually receiving low scores and criticism from the judges, the pair was consistently saved by the viewers' votes. They ultimately made it to the semi-finals of the competition where they finished in fifth place, tying with Juan Pablo Di Pace and Cheryl Burke.

For season 28, she was partnered with Queer Eye expert Karamo Brown. The couple was eliminated on the seventh week of competition, finishing in eighth place overall.

For season 29, she was paired with Catfish producer and host Nev Schulman. They finished in second place overall behind Kaitlyn Bristowe and Artem Chigvintsev.

For season 30, she was paired with dancer, singer, and YouTuber JoJo Siwa. They finished in second place overall behind Iman Shumpert and Daniella Karagach.

Season 23 
With celebrity partner Jake T. Austin

Season 23 
with James Hinchcliffe (Weeks 8 and 9, injury replacement)

Because of an injury to Sharna Burgess, Johnson returned to the show as the substitute partner for the INDYCAR driver in Weeks 8 and 9, replacing Burgess.  The scores listed reflect her weeks as his substitute.

Burgess returned in Week 10.  Idina Menzel was a guest judge in Week 9, taking Goodman’s place

Season 26 
With celebrity partner Adam Rippon

1 Score given by guest judge Rashad Jennings.

2 Score given by guest judge David Ross.

Season 27 
With celebrity partner Joe Amabile

Season 28 
With celebrity partner Karamo Brown.

Due to a death in the family of Jenna's childhood best friend Lindsay Arnold, Jenna stepped in to dance with former White House Press Secretary Sean Spicer for weeks 8 and 9. 

1 Score given by guest judge Leah Remini.

2 Stepping in for Lindsay Arnold to dance with Sean Spicer.

3 Score given by guest judge Joey Fatone.

Season 29 
With celebrity partner Nev Schulman

Season 30 
With celebrity partner JoJo Siwa

1 Derek Hough was absent so score was given out of 30.

Personal life
On June 14, 2018, Johnson and fellow Dancing with the Stars ballroom-dance professional Valentin Chmerkovskiy announced their engagement. They married on April 13, 2019. On July 15, 2022 Chmerkovskiy and Johnson announced that they are pregnant and due with their first child, a boy, in January 2023. Their son, Rome Valentin Chmerkovskiy, was born on January 10, 2023.

References

External links
 

1994 births
Living people
Artists from Provo, Utah
Dancers from Utah
American female dancers
American ballroom dancers
American women choreographers
American choreographers
So You Think You Can Dance (American TV series) contestants
21st-century American dancers
Dancing with the Stars (American TV series) winners
21st-century American women